Sutton is a village and civil parish in the District of Rochford in Essex, England. It is located between the River Roach and the adjoining Borough of Southend-on-Sea, and includes the hamlet of Shopland. It has a population of 127, increasing at the 2011 Census to 135, the smallest in the District, although at the time of the Domesday Book it had a flourishing village with its own market and fair.

The place-name 'Sutton' is first recorded in the Domesday Book of 1086, where it appears as Suttuna. The name means 'southern town or settlement'.

The place-name 'Shopland' is first attested in a list of c. 1000 AD of the manors of St Paul's Cathedral in Corpus Christi College, Cambridge (MS. 383), where it appears as Scopingland. It appears as Scopelanda in the Domesday Book of 1086, and as Scopiland in the Feet of Fines in 1208. The name means 'island with a shed', the first element being the Old English sceoppa, or the Middle English schoppe, meaning 'shop' or 'shed', the origin of the modern word 'shop'.

The area is known locally as Sutton with Shopland. Most of the civil parish of Shopland was amalgamated with Sutton in 1933. When St Mary Magdalene's church in Shopland was demolished in 1957 following wartime bomb damage, artifacts were removed and went to Sutton Church and others. Shopland churchyard is rededicated every year.

Sutton is rural with large farms, and is bordered by industrial estates on its northern (Purdeys Industrial Estate) and southern (Chandlers Way/Temple Farm Industrial Estate) borders.

Church

All Saints' Church is of Norman origin and is listed at Grade II* on the National Historic List for England (NHLE).

The chancel and nave date to the early 17th century. The bell turret dates to the 14th and 15th centuries. There are various  1869 and later repairs and restorations. The church is built of ragstone rubble, with Reigate stone and Barnack stone dressings. It has a red plain tiled roof and a cedar-shingled bell turret and spirelet. The church is unique among Essex churches inasmuch that its south door is of a rare rebated or interlocking type, with only five other churches in the county having similar doors. This door was faced to the south in 1869. Other examples can be found at the churches located in Castle Hedingham and Elmstead.

When the nearby Shopland church was demolished in 1957, due to partial ruin from the Second World War, a medieval coffin lid and brass, dated to 1371, of Sir Thomas Stapel, Sergeant at Arms to Edward III, was moved to All Saints' Church in 1971. The brass shows Stapel dressed in the armour he would have worn at the Battle of Crécy in 1346. All Saints' Church was declared redundant and permissible for secular use in 2015, and the brass and slab were moved again to St Andrew's Church in nearby Rochford, Essex in 2018, where they were set into the internal north wall of the tower.

References

External links

Sutton Parish Council

Villages in Essex
Civil parishes in Essex
Rochford District